Madjiguène Cissé (born in 1951) is a Senegalese activist, former spokeswoman of the undocumented immigrants movement and founder of the Women's Network for Sustainable Development in Africa.

Biography
Cissé was born in Dakar. Her parents were illiterate when they moved from the countryside to Dakar. Her ambitious and progressive father learned to read and got his driving license. At his request, Cissé started attending school in 1958. In 1968, she took part in demonstrations. After she obtained the Baccalauréat, she started her German studies. In 1974, she was granted a two-year scholarship to study in Saarbrücken, Germany.

She subsequently went back to Dakar and worked as a German teacher in a high school. In 1993, as a mother of three, she stayed in Paris for her daughter's studies. Although she had a legal residence permit, she discovered and joined the undocumented workers movement in March 1996 and became one of its spokespeople.

In 2000, she went back to Dakar where she co-founded the Women's Network for Sustainable Development in Africa (REFDAF) and became its director. The network aims at improving women's living standards through education, support actions to develop employment, and granting microcredits.

Published works
 Parole de sans-papiers, 1999. 
 Papiere für alle. Die Bewegung der Sans Papiers in Frankreich, A Verlag, Hamburg, 2002, .

Awards
1998: International League for Human Rights's Carl von Ossietzky Medal, alongside Les Collectifs de sans-papiers
2011: Markgräfin-Wilhelmine, Bayreuth city prize

References

External links
 
 REFDAF official website 

20th-century women
21st-century women
Senegalese activists
Germanists
Women linguists
20th-century educators
21st-century educators
1951 births
Living people
People from Dakar
20th-century women educators
21st-century women educators